The Ultimate Collection is a two disc Compilation album by Electric Light Orchestra (ELO) released in 2001.

Chart
 United Kingdom number 18, BPI certification: Gold
German Media Control Album Chart, number 63

Track list

References

Albums produced by Jeff Lynne
Electric Light Orchestra compilation albums
2001 compilation albums